Simon Hailwood is a British philosopher whose research concerns moral philosophy, political philosophy, environmental philosophy, environmental ethics, political realism, and pragmatism. He is a Professor of Philosophy in the Department of Philosophy at the University of Liverpool, which he joined in 2004 as a lecturer.

Hailwood is the author of Exploring Nozick: Beyond Anarchy, State and Utopia, a 1996 book about the philosophy of Robert Nozick published by Avebury; How to be a Green Liberal: Nature, Value and Liberal Philosophy, a 2003 book about green liberalism published by McGill-Queen's University Press; and Alienation and Nature in Environmental Philosophy, a 2015 book on environmental philosophy published by Cambridge University Press.

He is the managing editor of the journal Environmental Values.

References

British philosophers
Political philosophers
Environmental philosophers
Living people
Year of birth missing (living people)
Academics of the University of Liverpool